Virgin and Child with a Rosary is one of the last known paintings by the Italian artist Artemisia Gentileschi. Small in size and painted with oil on copper, it was completed in 1651. It was part of the Spanish royal collection and currently hangs in the El Escorial collection, in Spain.

Provenance
The painting is first mentioned in a 1749 inventory at La Granja, and was transferred to its current location by 1857. Recent research shows it was part of the collection of Maria Anna of Pfalz-Neuberg, second wife of Charles II, suggesting it may have been associated with Charles' father Philip IV.

Attribution
There has been some debate as to whether the painting is actually by Gentileschi, despite her signature appearing across the edge of the table. One scholar pointed to the use of bright red, blue and green in the painting, which Gentileschi does not use elsewhere. However, the 2001 catalogue for the exhibition at the Metropolitan Museum of Art, suggests the painting is by Gentileschi, and that it draws heavily on early devotional pictures by the artist Guido Reni. The stylistic shift may represent a deliberate tactic to appeal to the taste of the patron.

References

Sources

1650s paintings
Paintings by Artemisia Gentileschi
Paintings of the Madonna and Child